"You Can't Stop the Reign" is the first single released from Shaquille O'Neal's third album, You Can't Stop the Reign. The song was moderately successful, making it to 54 on the Hot R&B/Hip-Hop Singles & Tracks. Three versions of the song were released, the single version featuring three verses from Shaq, the album version, which featured 2 verses from The Notorious B.I.G. and a remix that was made by DJ Quik. The Notorious B.I.G.'s verse would later be posthumously re-used on "Unbreakable", the opening track of Michael Jackson's 2001 album Invincible.  The song contains a sample of 1987 hit "You Can't Stop the Rain" by Loose Ends.

Single track listing

A-Side
"You Can't Stop the Reign" (Single Version)- 4:40  
"Still Can't Stop the Reign" (Album Version)- 4:43

B-Side
"You Can't Stop the Reign" (Remix)- 4:38  
"You Can't Stop the Reign" (Single Instrumental)- 4:38

Charts

References

External links
Genius: You Can't Stop the Reign - Lyrics

1996 singles
1996 songs
Shaquille O'Neal songs
Songs written by Shaquille O'Neal
Interscope Records singles
The Notorious B.I.G. songs
Songs written by the Notorious B.I.G.